St Johnston railway station is a former railway station that served St Johnston, County Donegal in the Republic of Ireland. The Londonderry and Enniskillen Railway opened the station on 19 April 1847. It was taken over by the Great Northern Railway in 1883. It closed on 15 February 1965.

History 
St Johnston station was opened as a part of the Londonderry and Enniskillen Railway in 1847. The opening of the station brought prosperity to the village of St Johnston. After the partition of Ireland in 1921 the Irish Revenue Commissioners selected St Johnston as the location for the customs post for the link between County Donegal and County Londonderry in Northern Ireland, despite the customs officers being considered ineffective for the route, as smugglers tended not to use the railway when heading for Londonderry station. It was operated by Great Northern Railway and was known locally as the "Derry Road", for people passing through to connect at Londonderry to change trains to connect onwards to Belfast. 

In 1959, the majority of railways and railway stations in County Donegal were closed down in December.  However St Johnston remained open serving the route between Londonderry and Strabane until 1965 when the Ulster Transport Authority closed St Johnston down. The closure of St Johnston hit the village economically as they had relied on the income from customs officers based there, as the customs house closed along with the railway. The closure was also debated in the Senate of Northern Ireland, where Northern Irish senators objected to the closure citing economic viability, and one member stated that he had previously used St Johnston to deliver six combine harvesters to County Donegal.

Routes

References

Disused railway stations in County Donegal
Railway stations opened in 1847
Railway stations closed in 1965
1847 establishments in Ireland
1965 disestablishments in Ireland
Railway stations in the Republic of Ireland opened in 1847